A Toast of Love (吃吃面包谈谈情) is a Singaporean Chinese sitcom which aired in October 2003. It is a spin-off of the popular drama series Viva Le Famille. It was aired every Saturday at 9pm. There is no theme song used in the opening sequence.

Cast
Richard Low as Sun Yongfa
Hong Huifang as Pan Jinglian (姑姑 "Aunty")
Lin Meijiao as Stella (大喇叭 "Big Trumpet")
Chen Huihui as Huang Huifen
Rui En as Sun Yujia (Angela)
Dasmond Koh as Yang Jierong
Chen Tianwen as Wu Guanghui (Steven)
Nick Shen as Pan Weiwen (David)

Guest cast
Edmund Chen
Priscelia Chan
Jeff Wang
Jaime Teo
Michelle Liow
Alan Tern
Zen Chong
Liu Qiulian

Synopsis
Taxi driver Sun Yongfa stumbles upon Pan Jinglian's homemade kaya and discover that it is on par if not better than the ones sold in the market. He decides to open a bakery with her but things do not go as planned. Their children end up bickering with each other and get tangled with their own personal issues. Can Yongfa and Jinglian's business survive?

Trivia
Rui En's first drama collaboration with Dasmond Koh.

References

External links
A Toast of Love (Chinese) on MediaCorp website

Singapore Chinese dramas
Singaporean television sitcoms